The Australian Christian College – Moreton is an independent non-denominational Christian co-educational early learning, primary and secondary day school and distance education centre, located in Caboolture, Queensland, Australia. The School caters for children ranging from early learning to Year 12. As of 2013, Year 12 students can complete their Queensland Certificate of Education at the School.

Australian Christian College – Moreton is one of nine Australian Christian Colleges located in Australia.

Vision
The School's vision is to develop students who are equipped spiritually, academically, socially and physically to be a positive influence on the world.

The School is owned and operated by Christian Education Ministries Ltd and is a member of the Association of Independent Schools of Queensland.

The principal is Darren Lawson. The school has grown to approximately 1,850 students. It has a large distance education student cohort. Most students that attend the school reside in Caboolture, Morayfield, Bellmere, Burpengary, Ningi, Bribie Island and surrounds. In addition, the School offers distance education to students who reside across Queensland and beyond.

Enrolment
Enrolment is open to Christian students of all denominations as well as non-Christian students.

During the 2011 year, the school opened a new multi-purpose centre and administration building funded by the Australian Government's Building the Education Revolution scheme. In 2017, the school opened a double storey primary school building comprising 11 classrooms and a toilet block.

See also

List of schools in Queensland

References

External links
Official school website
Christian Education Ministries Ltd
Association of Independent Schools of Queensland

Schools in South East Queensland
Private primary schools in Queensland
Private secondary schools in Queensland
Moreton
Educational institutions established in 2009
2009 establishments in Australia
Caboolture, Queensland
Nondenominational Christian schools in Queensland
Buildings and structures in Moreton Bay Region